Tuy Đức is a rural district (huyện) of Đắk Nông province in the Central Highlands region of Vietnam.

Districts of Đắk Nông province